The women's 200 metres at the 2022 Commonwealth Games, as part of the athletics programme, took place in the Alexander Stadium on 4, 5 and 6 August 2022.

Records
Prior to this competition, the existing world and Games records were as follows:

Schedule
The schedule was as follows:

All times are British Summer Time (UTC+1)

Results

First round
First 3 in each heat (Q) and the next 6 fastest (q) advance to the Semifinals.

Wind:

Heat 1: 0.0 m/s, Heat 2: –0.1 m/s, Heat 3: +0.7 m/s, Heat 4: +1.3 m/s, Heat 5: +2.9 m/s, Heat 6: +2.7 m/s

Semifinals
First 2 in each heat (Q) and the next 2 fastest (q) advance to the Final.

Wind:

Heat 1: +1.9 m/s, Heat 2: 0.0 m/s, Heat 3: +1.5 m/s

Final
The medals were determined in the final.

Wind: +0.6m/s

References

Women's 200 metres
2022
2022 in women's athletics